"Miracles (Someone Special)" is a song by British rock band Coldplay and American rapper Big Sean. It was released on 14 July 2017 as the second single from the band's Kaleidoscope EP, being also the first time they featured a rapper in one of their songs since Jay-Z's remix for "Lost!". The song is noted for using sampling a line by Michael J. Fox from Back to the Future (1985),and was named one of the best songs of 2017 by 3voor12.

Music video
An official lyric video for the song was released on 15 July 2017. Directed by Ben Mor, it switches between several photographs, most of them concerning immigrants reaching Ellis Island, between the end of the 19th century and the beginning of the 20th.

Personnel
 Chris Martin – lead vocals, acoustic guitar
 Jonny Buckland – guitar
 Guy Berryman – bass guitar
 Will Champion – drums, percussion, backing vocals, electronic drums
 Big Sean – rap vocals

Charts

Weekly charts

Year-end charts

Certifications

Release history

References

External links

2017 songs
2017 singles
Coldplay songs
Big Sean songs
Songs written by Will Champion
Songs written by Chris Martin
Songs written by Guy Berryman
Songs written by Jonny Buckland
Songs written by Big Sean
Dance-pop songs
Parlophone singles